Turpan, also spelled as Turfan or Tulufan, could refer to the following:

Turpan, prefecture-level city, Xinjiang, China
Turpan Depression, a basin in Xinjiang containing the third-lowest exposed point on Earth